This theory was proposed in 1966 to go beyond BCS theory of superconductivity and it provides predictions of upper critical field in type-II superconductors. 

References

Superconductivity